The 2000–01 Connecticut Huskies men's basketball team represented the University of Connecticut in the 2000–01 collegiate men's basketball season. The Huskies completed the season with a 20–12 overall record. The Huskies were members of the Big East Conference where they finished with an 8–8 record. They made it to the Second Round in the 2001 National Invitation Tournament. The Huskies played their home games at Harry A. Gampel Pavilion in Storrs, Connecticut and the Hartford Civic Center in Hartford, Connecticut, and they were led by fifteenth-year head coach Jim Calhoun.

Roster
Listed are the student athletes who were members of the 2000–2001 team.

Schedule 

|-
!colspan=12 style=""| Exhibition

|-
!colspan=12 style=""| Regular Season

|-
!colspan=12 style=""| Big East tournament

|-
!colspan=12 style=""| NIT

Schedule Source:

References 

UConn Huskies men's basketball seasons
Connecticut Huskies
Connecticut Huskies
2000 in sports in Connecticut
2001 in sports in Connecticut